The 2006 All-Pro Team comprised the National Football League players that were named to the Associated Press (AP), Pro Football Writers Association (PFWA), or The Sporting News All-Pro teams in 2006.  Both first and second teams are listed for the AP team. The three teams are included in Total Football II: The Official Encyclopedia of the National Football League.  In 2006, the PFWA and the publication Pro Football Weekly combined their All-Pro teams.

Teams

Key
 AP = Associated Press first-team All-Pro
 AP-2 = Associated Press second-team All-Pro
 AP-2t = Tied for second-team All-Pro in the AP vote
 PFWA = Pro Football Writers Association All-NFL
 SN = Sporting News All-Pro

References
Pro-Football-Reference.com
ESPN.com

All-Pro Teams
Allpro